Schweighöfer may refer to:

 Matthias Schweighöfer (born 1981), German actor
 Schweighofer, an Austrian piano manufacturer